Walter Brunner (born 5 March 1961, in Sterzing) was an Italian luger who competed in the early 1980s. He won the gold medal in the men's doubles event at the 1984 FIL European Luge Championships in Olang, Italy.

References

External links
 

1961 births
Italian male lugers
Living people
Italian lugers
Sportspeople from Sterzing
Olympic lugers of Italy
Lugers at the 1984 Winter Olympics
Lugers at the 1988 Winter Olympics